Matías Ignacio Orellana Cuellar (born 22 December 1988) is a Chilean lawyer who was elected as a member of the Chilean Constitutional Convention.

References

External links
 
 BCN Profile

Living people
1988 births
21st-century Chilean politicians
Socialist Party of Chile politicians
Members of the Chilean Constitutional Convention